Komal Swaminathan (born 27 January 1935 in Karaikudi, Tamil Nadu, India, died 1995) was a congressional activist in his early years, a Tamil theater personality, film director and journalist.

Early life 
Swaminathan joined the school of S. V. Sahasranamam and learned the art of playwriting and stage techniques. In 1971, he formed Stage Friends.

Career 
He was a dramatist on the Tamil stage, his Thanneer Thanneer in 1980 brought him to the limelight. He scripted, directed and staged this play with his drama troupe "Stage Friends", this play was staged more than 250 times.

Komal Swaminathan has staged nearly 33 plays. He also directed the film Oru Indhiya Kanavu (An Indian Dream) and received the National Film Award for Best Regional film in 1984.

He was the editor of Subhamangala -a Literary, Socio-Cultural Tamil monthly magazine.  He was the recipient of Kalaimaamani and a number of other awards. Komal Swaminathan died in 1995. He had a daughter, Lalitha Dharini.

Filmography 
Plays
Komal has scripted and conducted the following plays with his own troupe
 Sannathi Theru, 1971
 Nawaab Narkali, 1971 (later adapted as the movie Nawaab Narkali)
 Manthiri Kumari, 1972
 Pattinam Paripogirathu, 1972
 Vaazvin Vaasal, 1973 (later adapted as a TV serial)
 Perumale Saatchi, 1974 (later adapted as the movie Kumara Vijayam)
 Jesus Varuvar, 1974
 Raja Parambarai, 1975 (later adapted as the movie Paalooti Valartha Kili)
 Yudha Kaandam, 1975 (later adapted as the movie Yudha Kaandam directed by him)
 Anju Puli Oru Penn, 1976
 Koodu Illa Kolangal, 1977 (Komal had originally named it Ilakkanam Meeriya Kavithaigal)
 Aatchi Matram, 1977
 Sultan Ekathasi, 1978
 Swarga Boomi, 1979 (later adapted as the movie Anal Kaatru directed by him)
 Chekku Maadugal,1980 (later adapted as the movie Saathikkoru Neethi)
 Thaneer Thaneer, 1980 (later adapted as the movie Thaneer Thaneer)
 Oru Inthiya Kanavu, 1982 (later adapted as the movie Oru Indhiya Kanavu directed by him)
 Asoka Vanam, 1983 (later adapted as a TV serial)
 Naliravil Petrom, 1984
 Manithan Ennum Theevu, 1985
 Irutile Thedatheenga, 1985 (later adapted as a TV serial)
 Karuppu Viyazakizamai, 1988
 Narkali, 1989 (later adapted as a TV play)
 Grama Rajyam, 1989
 Anbukku Panjamillai, 1992
 Pudhiya Paadhai
 Minnal Kolam
 Thillai Naayakam
 Doctorukku Marundhu
 Kalyaana Super Market
 Delhi Maamiyaar (later adapted as the movie Karpagam Vanthachu)
 Avan Paarthuppaan
 Appaavi
 Killiyoor Kanagam
 En Veedu En Kanavan En Kuzhanthai (later adapted as a TV play)

Screenwriter
Kallum Kaniyagum (1968)
Nawab Naarkali (1972)
Paalazhi Madhanam (1975; Malayalam)
Kumara Vijayam (1976)
Thanneer Thanneer (1981)
Kodai Mazhai (1986)

Director
Oru Indhiya Kanavu (1983)
Anal Kaatru (1983)
Yudha Kaandam (1983)

References

External links 
http://tfmpage.com/forum/26339.5890.23.51.04.html A Tribute to Komal Swaminathan by 'Cinema Virumbi
 

Indian folklorists
Tamil-language writers
Journalists from Tamil Nadu
1935 births
1995 deaths
Indian male dramatists and playwrights
20th-century Indian dramatists and playwrights
Tamil dramatists and playwrights
Tamil screenwriters
Tamil film directors
People from Thanjavur district
Screenwriters from Tamil Nadu
20th-century Indian male writers
20th-century Indian screenwriters